Dave "The Beast" Spitz (born February 22, 1958) is an American musician best known for having played bass guitar for the heavy metal group Black Sabbath from 1985 to 1987, appearing on the album Seventh Star and being credited for (but not playing on) The Eternal Idol. Dave also helped discover Ray Gillen, the vocalist who joined Black Sabbath mid-tour in 1986, following the sudden exit of Glenn Hughes.

Spitz was born in the Forest Hills neighborhood in the borough of Queens in New York City. He is the older brother of musician Dan Spitz, former lead guitarist of the American thrash metal band Anthrax.

Spitz has also been a member of Great White, having recorded the albums Psycho City and Let it Rock with the Californian hard rock band during the 1990s. He played with White Lion and on albums by Americade, Slamnation, Insomnia, Nuclear Assault, Purple Heart, Kuni, Deepset, War Pigs and others. He is also a member of McBrain Damage, featuring Iron Maiden drummer Nicko McBrain and tours with this band when Nicko has time off.

Dave Spitz graduated from SUNY Geneseo in upstate New York in 1979, and during his college years he played in bands around that area, including Freeway and Buzzoleo.

Beyond this, Dave is a second degree black belt (Nidan) in traditional Okinawan Gōjū-ryū Karate-dō. Beginning his karate training at the age of 14 in New York, Dave initially studied under the U.S.A. Kata champion sensei Chuck Merriman, and fought in numerous karate tournaments. Following his Black Sabbath years, he continued his martial arts training in California, undertaking training with the highest ranking practitioner of Gōjū-ryū in the world, sensei Morio Higaonna, President of the International Okinawan Gōjū-ryū Karate-dō Federation. Spitz also studied and trained with sensei Mel Pralgo, sensei Rodney Hu, sensei Stan O'Hara, and sensei Miko Peled, and had the distinct honor of being Dai Senpai (highest ranking student and assistant instructor) for many years at sensei Pralgo's dojo in Thousand Oaks, California, before moving to Florida in 1996 to attend law school.

References

Spitz on Black Sabbath Online

1958 births
Living people
Black Sabbath members
American heavy metal bass guitarists
American male bass guitarists
American rock bass guitarists
Jewish American musicians
Jewish heavy metal musicians
Great White members
White Lion members
American male guitarists
Impellitteri members
20th-century American guitarists